Before disbanding in 2015, the Southern Waste Management Partnership (SWaMP) coordinated the disposal and handling of municipal waste, including recycling, in the South of Northern Ireland. The local authorities that were covered by SWaMP (before local government in Northern Ireland was re-organised in 2015) included:

Armagh City and District Council
Banbridge District Council
Cookstown District Council
Craigavon Borough Council
Dungannon and South Tyrone Borough Council
Fermanagh District Council
Newry and Mourne District Council

SWaMP's key task was to establish a 20-year waste disposal contract for the region's future waste management requirements.

See also
ARC21
NWRWMG

References

Waste disposal authorities
Government agencies of Northern Ireland